The Peruman railway accident occurred on 8 July 1988, when a train derailed on the Peruman bridge over Ashtamudi Lake in Kerala, India and fell into the water, killing 105 people. The cause was never established, but was blamed on track alignment and faulty wheels, possibly compounded by failure to notify maintenance workers about the approach of a delayed train that had been making-up time by travelling at excessive speed.

Derailment
The accident occurred at Peruman bridge over Ashtamudi Lake, Perinadu, Kollam, Kerala, on 8 July 1988 at around 13:15 Hrs. Ten bogie carriages of the Train Number:26 Island Express, travelling from Bangalore to Thiruvananthapuram Central, derailed and fell into the lake. Of the 14 coaches, only the engine, the parcel van and a second class compartment had crossed the bridge when the derailment occurred. Two of the nine coaches that fell into the water turned upside down.

Rescue operations
The rescue operations were started immediately by the local people of Perumon and Munrothuruthu who were residing near the bridge. The injured were rushed to Kollam's district hospital and nearby private clinics. Realising the scale of the tragedy, three helicopters and over 100 navy divers were also pressed into service from Cochin, 140 km away. Union Minister of State for Railways Madhavrao Scindia, accompanied by Railway Board members, flew down in a chartered plane to supervise the rescue operations. Scindia announced an ex-gratia payment of Rs. 1 lakh (100,000) each to relatives of each of the dead.105 people lost their lives and around 200 people were injured.

Cause 

The exact cause of the accident is still unknown.
Tornado
A first inquiry conducted by the Commissioner for Railway Safety attributed the cause of train accident to a tornado. This finding has been widely disputed by the general public.

As per P. Venugopal, The Hindu newspaper's correspondent for Alappuzha district then

Track alignment and faulty wheels
A second inquiry, prompted by public outrage, revealed that problems in track alignment and faulty wheels of coaches were responsible for the tragedy.
The following possible causes, even though not officially acknowledged, have received widespread attention in media.
Speed
Some eyewitness are quoted saying that the train was running too fast for the bridge at the time of accident.
Track maintenance work
Some track maintenance may have been going on at the railway bridge. A report alleges the maintenance workers called up the nearest station and inquired about the passing trains. They were told that the Island Express which was due to pass is running late. The blog asserts the workers had lifted a section of rail and the repair was underway, then the workers went for a break, leaving the separated rail, assured that the train was not due. The train kept the right time and derailed on the bridge.

Observation of Arunkumar (18-07-2022):

I was traveling by road that night from Kozhikode to Trivandrum and was surprised by the number of Police vehicles and Ambulances on the road at that time of the night. It was only after reaching Trivandrum that I came to know about the nature & extent of the tragedy.

To me,the possibility of track maintenance and taking a work-break by the workers (under the mistaken impression that the Island Express was running late) sounds more probable.

In popular culture 
Perumon tragedy was featured in the 1990 Malayalam movie Iyer the Great. There is a short movie by Shankar Ramakrishnan that has been titled as "Island Express". The movie describes the connection of different people and their journey after the accident.

External links 
 https://eparlib.nic.in/bitstream/123456789/818678/1/08_XI_27-07-1988_p146_p147_PII.pdf
 https://eparlib.nic.in/bitstream/123456789/818710/1/08_XI_11-08-1988_p216_p252_PII.pdf

See also 
 List of Indian rail accidents
 Lists of rail accidents

References 

Derailments in India
1988 in India
Railway accidents in 1988
Transport in Kollam district
History of Kerala (1947–present)
Rail transport in Kerala
History of Kollam district
Disasters in Kerala
Railway accidents and incidents in Kerala